A guide is a person with specialized knowledge that helps laypersons travel through an area.

Guide or The Guide may also refer to:

Occupations
Guide, a person with specialized knowledge of an area who leads or conducts others
Museum docent, a guide at a museum, university or heritage place
Girl guide, a female member of a scouting organisation
Sighted guide, a person who guides a person who is blind or partially sighted
 Guide dog, assistance dogs trained to lead blind and vision impaired people around obstacles
Tracker (occupation), an individual who can follow the path left behind by animals, people or machines

Reference works
 Compendium, a work intended to summarize human knowledge in a particular field
 Encyclopedia, a work intended to summarize the whole of human knowledge
 Field guide, a reference for quickly identifying organisms or objects
 Guide book, a book that summarize attractions for tourists
 Guide to information sources, a work summarizing the important sources in a particular field
 Knowledge management database
 Owners manual, a book instructing a person how to use a product
 Price guide, a reference work containing prices of e.g. coins, collectibles, computers
 Study guide, a document intended to foster comprehension of literature, research topics, history, or other subjects

Media with the title
 Guide (Adventist magazine), a weekly publication for 10- to 14-year-olds
 Guide (magazine), a Philippine religious bimonthly
 The Guide, renamed WOW247, an entertainment supplement of The News (Portsmouth)
 The Guide, a novel by R. K. Narayan, an Indian author
 Guide (film) was also the name of a Hindi film based on the above novel
 The Guide (film), a 2014 Ukrainian film
 The Guide (Wommat), a 1994 album by Youssou N'Dour
 "The Guide", a 2016 song by Kid Cudi from Passion, Pain & Demon Slayin'

Places
 Guide, Henan, a former name of Shangqiu in Henan, China
 Guide County in Qinghai, China
 Guide, Lancashire, a village in England
 Guide, Mirandela, a village in Portugal
 Guide River, New Zealand
 The Guides, two islands off South Georgia
 Washington State Route 539, officially named the Guide Meridian Road, commonly known as "The Guide"

Ships 
 Guide,  a New Zealand Company teak-built Calcutta pilot brig wrecked in 1846
 Guide (ship), a convict ship that transported six convicts from Calcutta, India to Fremantle, Western Australia in 1855
USC&GS Guide (1918), an American survey ship in service from 1923 to 1941
USC&GS Guide (1929), an American survey ship in service from 1941 to 1942
, a US Navy minesweeper launched in 1941
, a US Navy minesweeper launched in 1954

Technology
 In mechanical design, something that steadies or directs the motion of an object, for example:
 Guide rail
 The “leading” screw of a screw-cutting lathe
 A loose pulley used to steady a driving-belt
 Electronic program guide, an on-screen guide to scheduled broadcast television programs
 Guide Plus, an interactive electronic programme guide system
 Guide (hypertext), the first commercially sold hypertext system, now unused
 Guide (software company), a software company that designs an app for changing text into streaming audio and video
 GUIDE International, a defunct IBM computer user group

See also
 
 
 Guidance (disambiguation)
 Indian Guides (disambiguation)
 Girl Guides (disambiguation)
Corps of Guides (disambiguation)
Pioneer (disambiguation)
Mentor (disambiguation)